Montana Vista is an unincorporated community in El Paso County, Texas, United States.  This Colonia lies northeast of Horizon City and far east of El Paso.

Montana Vista is located at  (31.682315, -106.196127). The community is part of the El Paso Metropolitan Statistical Area.

References

Unincorporated communities in El Paso County, Texas
Unincorporated communities in Texas